Abbas Mortada (born 1981) is a Lebanese politician. From 21 January to 10 August 2020, he served as Minister of Culture and Agriculture in the cabinet of Hassan Diab.

References 

Living people
1981 births
Place of birth missing (living people)
Government ministers of Lebanon
Agriculture ministers of Lebanon

Amal Movement politicians